Marco Aurelio Denegri Valega (1840–1909) was a Prime Minister of Peru under Andrés Avelino Cáceres in 1881. He was the mayor of Lima 1874–1875. He was Minister of Finance in 1879 and from 1881 to 1883. He served as the second vice president from 1886 to 1890.

References 

'

Mayors of Lima
Vice presidents of Peru
Prime Ministers of Peru
Peruvian Ministers of Economy and Finance
1840 births
1909 deaths